Colossus is the second album by Scorn, released in 1993 on Earache Records. It possesses elements of industrial and experimental music.

Critical reception
Trouser Press wrote that "Harris and Bullen back away from overkill on Colossus, loading on moody synth and distressing vocal samples to create an ominous modernist sound similar to God and Ice." Perfect Sound Forever wrote: "Better than their awkward debut, and not as dance floor trend-following monotonous as they would later become, this is a pretty fine album from what is probably Earache's most widely respected band."

Track listing

Personnel 
 Mick Harris – drums, drum programming, sampler, percussion,
 Nic Bullen – bass, sampler, percussion, voice, guitar
 Scorn – production, artwork (sleeve)
 Jon Wakelin – engineer, additional programming

References 

1993 albums
Earache Records albums
Music in Birmingham, West Midlands
Scorn (band) albums